Ropebrake Pass is a steep, narrow snow pass between the south end of Gabbro Hills and Mount Llano, permitting passage between the Barrett and Gough Glaciers. So named by the Southern Party of the New Zealand Geological Survey Antarctic Expedition (NZGSAE) (1963–64) because of the large number of rope brakes used in its crossing.
 

Mountain passes of the Ross Dependency
Dufek Coast